Riders of the Purple Sage may refer to:

Books
 Riders of the Purple Sage, the original novel by Zane Grey

Films
 Riders of the Purple Sage (1918 film), starring William Farnum 
 Riders of the Purple Sage (1925 film), starring Tom Mix
 Riders of the Purple Sage (1931 film), starring George O'Brien
 Riders of the Purple Sage (1941 film), starring George Montgomery
 Riders of the Purple Sage (1996 film), starring Ed Harris

Music
 Riders of the Purple Sage (band), three Western music bands
 New Riders of the Purple Sage, an American country rock band

Similar titles
 Riders of the Purple Wage, a 1967 science fiction novella by Philip José Farmer
 Writer of the Purple Rage, a 1994 collection of short works by Joe R. Lansdale